Nikos Perakis (born 11 September 1944) is a Greek writer and film director. He studied at the Fine Arts Academy of Munich. At that time he worked as a set and costume designer. His 1984 film Loafing and Camouflage was featured in the 35th Berlin International Film Festival.

Filmography
 Lina Braake (dir. Bernhard Sinkel, 1975)
  (1976)
  (1979)
 Arpa Colla (1982)
 Loafing and Camouflage (1984)
 Vios Kai Politeia (1987)
 Prostatis Oikogenias (1997)
 Thiliki etairia (1999}
 The Bubble (2001)
 H Lisa kai oloi oi alloi (2003)
 Loafing and Camouflage: Sirens in the Aegean (2005)
 Psyxraimia (2007)
 Artherapy (2010)
 Loafing and Camouflage: Sirens at Land (2011)

References

External links
 
 Nikos Perakis at Cine

1944 births
Living people
Greek film directors
Greek screenwriters
Film people from Athens
Egyptian people of Greek descent